Henry Albert Meyer (March 23, 1894 – March 25, 1968) of Indiana, was a philatelist who created notable stamp and postal history collections, and wrote and co-authored a number of philatelic books.

Collecting interests
Meyer was famous for a number of collections he formed, especially for his Ohio River steamboat covers. his Confederate States of America postal history collection, and his Hawaii collection.

Philatelic literature
Based on his study of river and steamboat history, he wrote Domestic Waterway Mail Markings in 1951. Along with Rear Admiral Frederic R. Harris and others, he co-authored Hawaii, Its Stamps and Postal History, which was published in 1948. Meyer co-authored with Dr. Carroll Chase to write The Postal History of the Kingdom of Westphalia Under Napoleon, 1807-1814 (published in 1958), and co-authored with Charles L. Towle to write Railroad Postmarks of the United States, 1861-1866, which was published in 1968.

Philatelic activity
Meyer was a member of the U.S. Philatelic Classics Society, and, at the National Philatelic Museum in Philadelphia, he was Program Chairman of the Perforation Centennial held in July 1957.

Honors and awards
Meyer was named to the American Philatelic Society Hall of Fame in 1969.

See also
 Philately
 Philatelic literature

References
 Henry Albert Meyer

1894 births
1968 deaths
Philatelic literature
American philatelists
American Philatelic Society